Joan Maria Vendrell Martínez  (born 4 August 1976) is a Catalunyan ski mountaineer.

Vendrell was born in Barcelona. He started ski mountaineering in 1992 and competed first in the Ransol-Serrera race in 1993. He has been member of the national team since 2006 and lives in Broto.

Selected results 
 1998:
 1st, Spanish Championship single race ("espoirs" class)
 2005:
 3rd, Spanish Championship vertical race
 3rd, Spanish Championship team race
 2008:
 9th ("civilian international men" ranking), Patrouille des Glaciers (together with Manuel Pérez Brunicardi and Danile León Roca)
 2009:
 2nd, European Championship relay race (together with Kílian Jornet Burgada, Manuel Pérez Brunicardi and Javier Martín de Villa)

External links 
 Joan Maria Vendrell at skimountaineering.org

1976 births
Living people
Spanish male ski mountaineers
Sportspeople from Barcelona
Ski mountaineers from Catalonia